Hard Bargain is a blues album by Albert King, released in 1996 with outtakes and previously unreleased material recorded between 1966 and 1972.

Track listing
"Overall Junction" (King) – 2:19
"Funk-Shun" (King) – 3:43
"You Sure Drive a Hard Bargain" (Crutcher, Jones) – 3:17
"You're Gonna Need Me" (King) – 2:48
"As the Years Go Passing By" (Deadric Malone) – 2:49
"Drownin' on Dry Land" (Gregory, Jones) – 4:23
"Heart Fixing Business" (Banks, Jones) – 3:26
"The Sky Is Crying" (Elmore James) – 5:29
"I Get Evil" (King) – 3:29
"Shake 'Em Down" (Nix) – 3:09
"I Believe to My Soul" (Charles) – 4:36
"Got to Be Some Changes Made" (King) – 4:29
"Albert's Groove, No. 2" (King) – 2:32

Personnel
 Albert King – Electric guitar and vocals
 Booker T. Jones – Piano and Organ
 Isaac Hayes – Piano
 Steve Cropper – Guitar
 Donald Dunn – Bass
 Al Jackson Jr. – drums

References

1996 albums
Albert King albums
Stax Records albums